Economic Geyser is a geyser in the Upper Geyser Basin of Yellowstone National Park in the United States.

Economic Geyser is a small, usually inactive geyser located between the Giant Geyser group and the Grand Geyser group. Economic Geyser was once a popular, frequently-erupting geyser until it became essentially dormant in the 1920s.

Economic Geyser is believed to be named for its behavior during its active days. It is reported that most of the water ejected drained back into the vent after the eruption, thus making the geyser appear to conserve its water. It was most likely named by Frank Jay Haynes, the park photographer from 1883-1916.

The temperature of the water in geyser pools and other geothermal features can be judged by the color of the bacteria living in the water. Changes in the size and color of bacteria mats at Economic Geyser imply that the geyser is heating up. Photographs of the geyser vent taken in the 1990s show a quiet pool very dark with algae. Photographs of the vent taken in 2006 show a pool of clear water with traces of the bacterial colors associated with higher temperatures.

References

Geysers of Wyoming
Geothermal features of Teton County, Wyoming
Geothermal features of Yellowstone National Park
Geysers of Teton County, Wyoming